Yvette is a French feminine given name.

Yvette may also refer to:

Places
Yvette (river), a river in France
Gif-sur-Yvette, a commune in France
 Canton of Gif-sur-Yvette
Villebon-sur-Yvette, a commune in France
1340 Yvette, a main-belt asteroid

People with the surname
 Mercedes Yvette (born 1981), U.S. fashion model

Entertainment
"Yvette", a short story by Guy de Maupassant published in 1884
Yvette, the Fashion Princess, a 1922 German silent comedy film
Yvette (1928 film), a French silent drama directed by Alberto Cavalcanti 
Yvette (1938 film), a German historical drama directed by Wolfgang Liebeneiner

Other uses
Tropical Storm Yvette, the name Yvette has been used for several tropical cyclones worldwide
Creme Yvette, a liqueur

See also

 
 Evette (disambiguation)
 Yvonne (disambiguation)
 Yvon (disambiguation)
 Yves (disambiguation)
 Eve (disambiguation)

cs:Iveta
hu:Ivetta
pl:Iweta
sk:Iveta